Hyphessobrycon borealis is a species of tetra in the family Characidae.

Distribution
Hyphessobrycon borealis is commonly found in French Guiana, where it has been discovered in many coastal river systems.

Description
Hyphessobrycon borealis has a tail very similar to the Buenos Aires tetra, with its black patch jutting out into yellow and then turning clear. A long black line runs down its body with an iridescent black below it and an iridescent gray above it.

References 

Characidae
Tetras
Fish of South America
Taxa named by Axel Zarske
Taxa named by Pierre-Yves Le Bail 
Taxa named by Jacques Géry
Fish described in 2006